Visa requirements for Djiboutian citizens are administrative entry restrictions by the authorities of other states placed on citizens of Djibouti. As of 2 July 2022, Djiboutian citizens had visa-free or visa on arrival access to 48 countries and territories, ranking the Djibouti passport 98th in terms of travel freedom according to the Henley Passport Index.

Visa requirements map

Visa requirements

Dependent, Disputed, or Restricted territories
Unrecognized or partially recognized countries

Dependent and autonomous territories

See also

Visa policy of Djibouti
Djibouti passport

References and Notes
References

Notes

Djibouti
Foreign relations of Djibouti